Chloride intracellular channel protein 6 is a protein that in humans is encoded by the CLIC6 gene.

The CLIC6 gene encodes a member of the chloride intracellular channel family of proteins. The gene is part of a large triplicated region found on chromosomes 1, 6, and 21. An alternatively spliced transcript variant has been described, but its biological validity has not been determined.

Interactions
CLIC6 has been shown to interact with Dopamine receptor D3.

See also
 Chloride channel

References

Further reading

External links
 
 

Ion channels